Marcos Mereles is an Argentine film director, screenwriter and producer, best known for his feature film debut All Is Vanity.

Career 
From 2016 to 2019, Mereles wrote, produced and directed a series of short films that were selected in film festivals such as Fantasia Film Festival, Nashville Film Festival, Cleveland Film Festival, Imagine Film Festival, East End Film Festival, Indianapolis Film Festival among others.

His first feature film, All Is Vanity, premiered at the BFI London Film Festival 2021 and was released in select cinemas in the United Kingdom in 2022.

Personal life 
He currently resides in London, England.

Filmography

As writer, producer and director 
2021 All Is Vanity (feature film) 
2019 Nevezuchiy (short film)
2017 De Dode Spreekt (short film)
2017 Florinda e Floriana (short film)
2016 Nochebuena (short film)

Awards & nominations

References

External links

Argentine film directors
Argentine film producers
Argentine screenwriters
Argentine male writers
Argentine expatriates in the United Kingdom
South American film directors
English-language film directors
Year of birth missing (living people)
Living people